The Great Sheep Panic (also known as the Great Sheep Panic of 1888 or the Mysterious Oxfordshire Sheep Panic of 1888) was an event that occurred on 3 November 1888 across southern England, when tens of thousands of sheep fled from various fields across some 200 square miles of Oxfordshire.

Event
On the evening of 3 November 1888, at about eight o'clock, thousands of sheep had, by a simultaneous impulse, burst from their bonds, fields and dwellings and had been found the next morning, widely scattered, some of them still panting with terror under hedges, and many crowded into corners of fields, some miles from the fields they had been left in the previous evening. The Times reported on 20 November 1888 that "malicious mischief was out of the question because a thousand men could not have frightened and released all these sheep." Interestingly, another panic occurred in 1889, in Berkshire (southern England), not far from Reading.

Possible explanation

In 1921 the scientific journal Nature noted that the 3 November 1888 had been "an intensely dark night, with occasional flashes of lightning" and explained that "panics have often occurred, for sheep are notoriously timid and nervous animals".

References

1888 in England
19th century in Oxfordshire
Earth mysteries
Mass psychogenic illness
November 1888 events
Unexplained phenomena